Malësi e Madhe is a municipality in Shkodër County, in northwestern Albania. The municipality consists of the administrative units of Gruemirë, Kastrat, Kelmend, Qendër, Shkrel with Koplik constituting its seat. As of the Institute of Statistics estimate from the 2011 census, there were 30,823 people residing in Malësi e Madhe Municipality. The area of the municipality is 951.01 km2.

References

External links 

bashkiamalesiemadhe.gov.al – Official Website 

 
Gegëri
Municipalities in Shkodër County